The 2020 end of year rugby union tests, also referred to as the 2020 Autumn internationals in the Northern Hemisphere, were a number of rugby union test matches contested during the months of October, November and December 2020, primarily involving countries from the Northern Hemisphere hosting those from the Southern Hemisphere. Also involved in matches were those from second-tier teams. These international games counted towards World Rugby's ranking system, with a team typically playing from two to four matches during this period.

Due to the COVID-19 pandemic causing a delay or cancellation of many nations' scheduled matches, a different format was developed for this year. The Autumn Nations Cup, an eight-team tournament involving England, Fiji, France, Georgia, Ireland, Italy, Scotland and Wales, replaced the cancelled matches. Also as a result of the pandemic, this year's fixtures incorporated postponed matches from the 2020 Six Nations Championship and 2020 Rugby Europe Championship, the 2020 South American Rugby Championship and all matches from the 2020 Tri Nations Series.

Fixtures

Bledisloe Cup – Part 1

Notes:
 Hoskins Sotutu, Caleb Clarke and Tupou Vaa'i (all New Zealand), and Filipo Daugunu, Hunter Paisami and Harry Wilson (all Australia) made their international debuts.
 Michael Hooper became the 12th Wallaby to earn his 100th test cap.
 This was the first draw between the two nations since they drew 12–12 at ANZ Stadium in 2014, and the first in New Zealand since they drew 9–9 at Athletic Park in 1962.
 Due to travel restrictions, the opening two matches of the Bledisloe Cup were officiated by non-neutral referees with the support of the respective unions and their coaches.
 Beauden Barrett was originally named at fullback for New Zealand, but withdrew due to an achilles injury and was replaced by Damian McKenzie. Nepo Laulala then withdrew from the bench at tighthead for personal reasons, and was replaced by Tyrel Lomax.

Bledisloe Cup – Part 2

Notes:
 Alex Hodgman and Peter Umaga-Jensen (both New Zealand) made their international debuts.
 Rieko Ioane was originally named on the bench but ruled out on match day and was replaced by Peter Umaga-Jensen.
 Due to travel restrictions, the opening two matches of the Bledisloe Cup were officiated by non-neutral referees with the support of the respective unions and their coaches.

23–25 October

Notes:
 Oli Kebble and Duhan van der Merwe (both Scotland) made their international debuts.
 Finn Russell (Scotland) earned his 50th test cap.
 This was Scotland's largest winning margin over Georgia, surpassing the 34-point difference set in August 2019.

Notes:
 This was the 100th meeting between the two nations.
 France recorded back-to-back victories over Wales for the first time since 2011.
 Alun Wyn Jones (Wales) equalled New Zealand's Richie McCaw's record for the most capped rugby player (148; 139 for Wales, 9 for the British and Irish Lions).
 Sam Parry and Louis Rees-Zammit (both Wales) made their international debuts.

30 October – 1 November

Notes:
 Felipe Aliaga, Eric Dosantos, Juanjuan Garese and Ignacio Péculo (all Uruguay) and Andrés Alvarado, Bautista Güemes and Joel Merkler (all Spain) made their international debuts.

6–7 November

Notes:
 José Irileguy, Mateo Perillo and Ignacio Rodríguez (all Uruguay) and Daniel Barranco and Leandro Wozniak (both Spain) made their international debut.

20–21 November

Notes:
 Valentin Ambrósio and Hugo Mendes (both Portugal) and Adrio de Melo Guilherme Dias, Lucas Spago and Rafael Teixeira (all Brazil) made their international debuts.

27–28 November

5 December

Cancelled fixtures

Notes

See also
 2020 July rugby union tests
 2020 South American Rugby Championship
 2020 Rugby Championship
 Autumn Nations Cup
 2020 Rugby Europe Championship
 2020 Six Nations Championship

References

2018
End-of-year rugby union internationals
End-of-year rugby union internationals
End-of-year rugby union internationals
End-of-year rugby union internationals
End-of-year rugby union internationals
October 2020 sports events in France
October 2020 sports events in New Zealand
October 2020 sports events in the United Kingdom
November 2020 sports events in Europe
November 2020 sports events in South America